Chrosiothes iviei is a species of comb-footed spider in the family Theridiidae. It is found in Mexico.

References

Theridiidae
Spiders described in 1964